Moxey may refer to:

People
 Dean Moxey (born 1986), English professional footballer
 Edward P. Moxey (1881–1943), American accountant
 Eric Moxey (1894–1940), Royal Air Force officer
 Ginger Moxey, Bahamian businesswoman and politician
 Hugh Moxey (1909–1991), English actor
 Jez Moxey (born 1963), football (soccer) executive
 Jim Moxey (born 1953), Canadian ice hockey player
 John Llewellyn Moxey (born 1925), Argentinian film and television director
 Jonathan Moxey (born 1995), American football player
 Osbourne Moxey (born 1978), Bahamian long jumper

Fiction
 Albert Arthur Moxey, a character in the British TV series Auf Wiedersehen, Pet

See also 
 Moxie (disambiguation)
 Moxy (disambiguation)